Year 996 (CMXCVI) was a leap year starting on Wednesday (link will display the full calendar) of the Julian calendar.

Events 
 By place 

 Japan 
 February - Chotoku Incident: Fujiwara no Korechika and Takaie shoot an arrow at Retired Emperor Kazan.

 2 March: Emperor Ichijo orders the imperial police to raid Korechika’s residence; Empress Teishi (sister of Korechika) cuts her hair because of the humiliation; Takaie is arrested, Korechika is absent. 

 5 March: Korechika returns with his head shaven and attired as a monk.

 Europe 
 Spring – King Otto III starts his first expedition to Italy from Regensburg, and proceeds over the Brenner Pass. News of Otto's arrival prompts Crescentius II (the Younger), patrician (the de facto ruler) of Rome, to invite Pope John XV (exiled in Tuscany) back to Rome. Otto arrives in Verona, and receives ambassadors of Doge Pietro II Orseolo of Venice.
 May 21 – Otto III, 16, is crowned Emperor of the Holy Roman Empire at St. Peter's Basilica, and claims also the title of King of Italy. His grandmother, Adelaide, retires to a convent she has founded at Seltz (Alsace). Otto puts down a Roman rebellion; a number of nobles (including Crescentius II) are banished for their crimes. 
 October 24 – King Hugh I Capet dies in Paris after a 9-year reign and is interred in the Basilica of St. Denis. He is succeeded by his 24-year-old son Robert II (the Pious) as king of France. Robert tries (during his reign) to increase his power, by pressing his claim of feudal lands that become vacant. This results in many territorial disputes.
 November 1 – Otto III grants the Bavarian bishopric of Freising 30 "royal hides" of land (about 800 hectares, or 2,000 acres - 800 hectares is 2,000 acres) in Neuhofen an der Ybbs (Lower Austria). A document (the oldest known) marks the first use of the name Ostarrîchi, meaning "Eastern Realm" (Austria in Old High German).
 November 20 – Richard I (the Fearless), duke of Normandy, dies after a 55-year reign. He is succeeded by his young son Richard II. During his minority, Rodulf of Ivry (his uncle), who wields the power as regent puts down a peasants revolt at the beginning of Richard's reign.

 Africa 
 May 15 – The new Fatimid navy is destroyed by fire, resulting in anti-Christian pogroms in Cairo.
 October 14 – Caliph Al-Aziz Billah dies at Bilbeis in Egypt after a 21-year reign in which he has expanded his Shiite caliphate at the expense of the Byzantines, using Turkish mercenaries (Mamelukes). He is succeeded by his 11-year-old son Al-Hakim bi-Amr Allah as ruler of the Fatimid Caliphate (until 1021).
 Revolt of Tyre: The citizens of Tyre (modern Lebanon) revolt against the Fatimid Caliphate. Al-Hakim bi-Amr Allah sends a expeditionary army and navy to blockade the city by land and sea.

 China 
 The Niujie Mosque is constructed in Beijing during the Liao Dynasty. The first mosque is built under supervision of the Muslim architect Nazaruddin.

 By topic 

 Religion 
 April 1 – Pope John XV dies of fever after an 11-year reign. Meeting a Roman embassy at Ravenna, Otto appoints his cousin Bruno of Carinthia (a grandson of the late Emperor Otto I), who duly ascends as Gregory V. He becomes the 138th pope – and the first German pope of the Catholic Church.

Births 
 July 29 – Fujiwara no Norimichi, Japanese nobleman (d. 1075)
 Drogo of Mantes, count of Valois and the Vexin (d. 1035)
 Elvira Menéndez, queen consort of León (approximate date)
 Oda of Meissen, queen consort of Poland (approximate date)

Deaths 
 March 12 – Odo I, Count of Blois (Eudes), French nobleman
 April 1 – John XV, pope of the Catholic Church
 October 14 – Al-Aziz Billah, Fatimid caliph (b. 955)
 October 24 – Hugh I Capet, king of France (b. 941)
 November 20 – Richard I, duke of Normandy (b. 932)
 Abu Talib al-Makki, Shafi'i jurist and hadith scholar
 Li Fang, Chinese scholar and encyclopedist (b. 925)
 Gilla Pátraic mac Donnchada, king of Osraige (Ireland)
 Herman I, Count Palatine of Lotharingia (the Slender), German nobleman (b. 945) 
 Ibn Abi Zayd, Muslim imam and scholar (b. 922)
 Ki no Tokibumi, Japanese waka poet (b. 922)
 Strachkvas, Bohemian prince and chronicler
 Takashina no Takako, Japanese female poet

References